The canton of Sillé-le-Guillaume is an administrative division of the Sarthe department, northwestern France. Its borders were modified at the French canton reorganisation which came into effect in March 2015. Its seat is in Sillé-le-Guillaume.

It consists of the following communes:
 
Ancinnes
Assé-le-Boisne
Assé-le-Riboul
Beaumont-sur-Sarthe
Bérus
Béthon
Bourg-le-Roi
Chérancé
Chérisay
Crissé
Doucelles
Douillet
Fresnay-sur-Sarthe
Fyé
Gesnes-le-Gandelin
Grandchamp
Le Grez
Juillé
Livet-en-Saosnois
Maresché
Moitron-sur-Sarthe
Montreuil-le-Chétif
Mont-Saint-Jean
Moulins-le-Carbonnel
Neuvillette-en-Charnie
Oisseau-le-Petit
Parennes
Pezé-le-Robert
Piacé
Rouessé-Fontaine
Rouessé-Vassé
Rouez
Saint-Aubin-de-Locquenay
Saint-Christophe-du-Jambet
Saint-Georges-le-Gaultier
Saint-Léonard-des-Bois
Saint-Marceau
Saint-Ouen-de-Mimbré
Saint-Paul-le-Gaultier
Saint-Rémy-de-Sillé
Saint-Victeur
Ségrie
Sillé-le-Guillaume
Sougé-le-Ganelon
Thoiré-sous-Contensor
Le Tronchet
Vernie
Vivoin

References

Cantons of Sarthe